The 2012–13 season is Nottingham Forest Football Club's 5th consecutive season in the Championship since promotion in 2007-08.

First Team Squad

Transfers in

Transfers out

1Fee was officially reported as Undisclosed.

Loans in

Loans out

Squad statistics

Appearances and goals
''This is a list of the first-team players from the 2012–13 season.

|}

Competitions

Championship

Table

Results summary

Matches

Competitive

Championship

August

September

October

November

December

January

February

March

April

May

League Cup

FA Cup

Pre-season

References

Nottingham Forest F.C. seasons
Nottingham Forest